Tuen Mun Football Club is a Hong Kong football club which currently competes in the Hong Kong Third Division.

History
Founded in 2001, the team had been representing Tuen Mun District to compete in the Hong Kong Third 'District' Division League, having won the Hong Kong Third 'District' Division League in the 2004–05 season. However, they became independent from the Tuen Mun District and joined the Hong Kong Third 'A' Division League.

In the 2006–07 season, they became the champions of the Hong Kong Third 'A' Division League, but eventually lost in the Hong Kong Third Division League Final Round and failed to gain promotion.

In the 2011–12 season, they became the runner-up of the Hong Kong Third 'A' Division League. Then in the Hong Kong Third Division League Final Round, they successfully gained promotion to the Hong Kong Second Division League next season.

In the 2016-17 season, TMFC finished bottom of the league and were relegated back to the Third Division, having lost 15 games and only winning 2 out of the 22 games in the season.

In the 2017–18 season, TMFC finished second bottom in the Third Division and were eliminated from the Hong Kong football league system.

After the expansion of the Third Division to 20 teams, TMFC re-entered the pyramid during the 2021–22 season.

Honours

League
 Hong Kong Third A Division
Champions (1): 2006–07
Runners-up (1): 2011–12
 Hong Kong Third District Division
Champions (1): 2004–05

References

Football clubs in Hong Kong
2001 establishments in Hong Kong

zh:屯門足球會